Joshua Budziszewski Benor  (30 May 1950 – 3 June 2006) was a Polish painter, sculptor and photographer.

He studied painting at Academy of Fine Arts in Warsaw, graduating in 1975.

20th-century Polish painters
20th-century Polish male artists
21st-century Polish painters
21st-century Polish male artists
1950 births
2006 deaths
Academy of Fine Arts in Warsaw alumni
Polish male painters